Team Win Recovery Project (TWRP), pronounced "twrp", is an open-source software custom recovery image for Android-based devices. It provides a touchscreen-enabled interface that allows users to install third-party firmware and back up the current system which are functions often unsupported by stock recovery images. It is, therefore, often installed when flashing, installing, or rooting Android devices, although it isn't dependent on a device being rooted prior to installation.

Functions 

Since February 2016 the first three digits of the version number specify the version, and the fourth digit, separated from the others by a dash, specifies an update for a specific device. This could be a performance improvement, hotfix, bugfix, or just simply an update for a device.

The main method of installing ("flashing") this custom recovery on an Android device requires downloading a version made specifically for the device, and then using a tool such as Fastboot or Odin.  Also, some custom ROMs come with TWRP as the default recovery image.

TWRP gives users the option to fully back up their device (including bootloader, system data, private applications, etc.) to revert to at any time, and a built-in file manager to delete files that may be causing problems on the device or add some to fix issues.

, TWRP supported the installation of custom ROMs (i.e. custom operating systems such as LineageOS, or the latest Android release), kernels, add-ons (Google Apps, Magisk, themes, etc.), and other various mods.

Wiping, backing up, restoring, and mounting various device partitions, such as the system, boot, userdata, cache, and internal storage partitions are also supported. TWRP also features file transfer via MTP, as well as a basic file manager, and a terminal emulator. It is fully themeable.

In January 2017, the TWRP team released an Android application that allows flashing the recovery using root access. However, unlike the recovery, the app is not open source. This app is also shipped via the official TWRP images to rooted and non-rooted devices. It is installed in the system partition, making it a system-level app by default, thus making it not uninstallable from within Android without root access. However, TWRP now provides the user the freedom of choice for having the app.

See also
 ClockworkMod Recovery – a past alternative to TWRP custom recovery.

References 

Android (operating system) software
Computer-related introductions in 2011
Free and open-source Android software

External links
 Official website